Barbara Brandriff Crabb (born March 17, 1939) is a senior United States district judge of the United States District Court for the Western District of Wisconsin.

Education and career

Born in Green Bay, Wisconsin, Crabb received a Bachelor of Arts degree from the University of Wisconsin–Madison in 1960 and a Bachelor of Laws from the University of Wisconsin Law School in 1962. She was in private practice in Madison, Wisconsin from 1962 to 1968. She was a research assistant to George Bunn of the University of Wisconsin Law School from 1968 to 1969, and for the American Bar Association Project on Minimum Standards of Criminal Justice from 1970 to 1971. She served as a United States magistrate judge for the Western District of Wisconsin from 1971 to 1979.

Federal judicial service

On July 21, 1979, Crabb was nominated by President Jimmy Carter to a new seat on the United States District Court for the Western District of Wisconsin created by 92 Stat. 1629. She was confirmed by the United States Senate on October 31, 1979, and received her commission on November 2, 1979. She served as Chief Judge from 1980 to 1996 and again from 2001 to 2010. On March 24, 2010, Crabb took senior status when her successor, Judge William M. Conley, was confirmed as federal judge.

Notable rulings
In 2010, Crabb ruled in a suit that the Freedom From Religion Foundation filed in 2008 against the Obama administration that the National Day of Prayer is unconstitutional. This ruling was reversed by the U.S. Court of Appeals for the Seventh Circuit in 2011, which found that the plaintiffs in the suit lacked standing to sue.

In 2013, Crabb ruled in another suit, Freedom from Religion Foundation v. Lew, that the Internal Revenue Code's "clergy housing allowance exclusion" or "parsonage exemption" (providing that clergy members' housing allowance were exempt from federal income tax) was unconstitutional; the Seventh Circuit vacated this ruling, finding that plaintiffs lacked standing.

In 2014, Crabb ruled in the case Wolf v. Walker that Wisconsin's ban on same-sex marriage (in its state constitution and statutes) was an unconstitutional violation of due process and equal protection. This ruling was affirmed by the Seventh Circuit.

In 2016, Crabb joined Circuit Judge Kenneth Francis Ripple in finding that the high number of wasted votes created by the 2011 Wisconsin State Assembly redistricting was unconstitutional partisan gerrymandering, over dissent by District Judge William C. Griesbach. The opinion was vacated and remanded by the United States Supreme Court on June 18, 2018.

References

External links
 
 

1939 births
Living people
Judges of the United States District Court for the Western District of Wisconsin
United States district court judges appointed by Jimmy Carter
20th-century American judges
University of Wisconsin–Madison alumni
University of Wisconsin Law School alumni
Lawyers from Madison, Wisconsin
United States magistrate judges
People from Green Bay, Wisconsin
21st-century American judges
20th-century American women judges
21st-century American women judges